Eldoniids are an extinct clade of enigmatic disc-shaped animals which lived in the early to middle Paleozoic (Cambrian to Devonian). They are characterized by their "medusoid" (jellyfish-shaped) bodies, with the form of a shallow dome opening below to an offset mouth supplemented by filamentous tentacles. Internally, they have a distinctive C-shaped cavity encompassing the gut, as well as hollow radial (radiating) structures arranged around a central ring canal. Most eldoniids are soft-bodied and can only be preserved in lagerstätten, but a few species may have hosted mineralized deposits. Historically, the affinities of eldoniids was enigmatic; recently, they been assessed as cambroernid deuterostomes. Their lifestyle is still an unresolved question; some authors reconstruct eldoniids as free-floating planktonic predators similar to jellyfish, while others argue that they were passive detritivores, embedded within the seabed for much of their life.

Classification 
Eldoniids have a frequently fluctuating species composition and their relationship to other animals has been controversial. Some authors argued that they represented early holothurians (sea cucumbers), while others stressed their similarity to lophophorates (a subset of lophotrochozoans with ciliated tentacles known as lophophores). In 2010, eldoniids were allied with two other unusual Cambrian genera: Herpetogaster and Phlogites. Together, they comprise the cambroernids, an informal clade. Cambroernids are probably deuterostomes, specifically stem- or crown-group ambulacrarians related to echinoderms and hemichordates.

Eldoniidae was a family first established in reference to Eldonia, a disc-shaped fossil named in 1911. Eldonia was one of many mysterious soft-bodied animals discovered in the Cambrian-age Burgess Shale of Canada. It is also a major component of the Late Ordovician Tafilalt biota of Morocco. Eldonia was initially mistaken for a scyphozoan (jellyfish), and was not the only member of the group originally misidentified as a cnidarian. Others include Vellumbrella (mistaken for a jellyfish), Discophyllum (mistaken for a coral), and Paropsonema (mistaken for a jellyfish-like porpitoid hydrozoan). Eldoniids, in a broad definition, also include Rotadiscus, Stellostomites, Pararotadiscus, and Seputus. Apart from Eldonia, the most abundant and well-preserved eldoniid species are from the Cambrian of China: Stellostomites eumorphus and Rotadiscus grandis are from the Chengjiang biota of Yunnan, and Pararotadiscus guizhouensis is from the Kaili Formation of Guizhou.

Dzik (1989) named the class Eldonioidea to encompass "velumbrellids" (i.e. eldoniids) and the goblet-shaped Cambrian animal Dinomischus. Eldonioidea was divided further into the orders Dinomischida (containing solely Dinomischus) and Vellumbrellida. The latter order was divided into Eldoniidae and Rotadiscidae. Most subsequent authors doubt a close relationship between Dinomischus and eldoniids. As a result, "Eldonioid" and "Eldoniid" have been used interchangeably by many recent publications. Some authors classify the rotadiscids and post-Cambrian "paropsonemids" as informal groups within Eldoniidae, while others maintain rotadiscids and "paropsonemids" as separate eldonioid families.

Anatomy 

The basic eldonioid body plan is oriented around two circular discs sealed together with the viscera in between. The ventral (lower) disc is concave from below while the dorsal (upper) is convex from above, providing a dome-like profile to the body. The rim of the body is smooth, though the margin may furl slightly inwards under the ventral disc. Sediment infillings or differences in preservation allow for hollow internal structures to be differentiated from solid sheets of tissue within the body.

The ventral disc acts as a platform for numerous elongated internal structures arranged in a radiating pattern. These narrow structures, known as “radial sacs” (also “radial lobes” or "internal lobes"), were most likely hollow cavities. They are among the most visible features in most fossils. The sacs are divided from each other by thin ligamentous walls, described as “septa” or “mesenteries”. In most eldoniid species, each radial sac bifurcates (divides into two parts) near the rim of the disc. The radial sacs thin towards the center of the disc, but do not converge at a single point. Instead, they intersect with a small ring-shaped cavity or canal in the central part of the ventral disc. The radial sacs and ring cavity were likely filled with fluids, akin to a hydrostatic skeleton or (less likely) an echinoderm-like water vascular system.

In most eldonioids, the center of the body is solid, but in other species, there is a rigid central cavity which tapers towards the ventral or dorsal disc. All eldonioids bear a thick, easily-recognizable coiled sac which rings around the middle of the body. The coiled sac is a horseshoe-shaped cavity that curves dextrally (clockwise) from the mouth to the anus. It sheaths the alimentary canal (gut), which is thinner and more difficult to discern in most fossils. In the best-preserved eldoniids, the gut can be divided into three regions: the esophagus or pharynx (front), stomach (middle), and intestine (rear). The stomach is usually the broadest part of the gut, and the portion of the coiled sac surrounding it is stained a dark color. The mouth and anus are positioned close to each other and open through the ventral disc. A small number of circumoral feeding tentacles project out of the mouth. Their basic form is shrub-shaped, with a pair of main shafts that split away from each other and divide further into smaller filaments. Some authors referred to the circumoral tentacles as a “lophophore”, a term used for the hollow filamentous tentacles of lophophorates such as brachiopods and bryozoans.

The dorsal disc is usually more rigid and resistant to distortion than the ventral disc. In several taxa, the dorsal disk is ornamented by one or more irregular concentric (ring-shaped) wrinkles, which may be growth lines or artefacts of compression. According to some interpretations, radial ridges, wrinkles, or grooves also ornament part of the dorsal disc in some rotadiscids. “Paropsonemids” have even more complex dorsal discs, combining radial and concentric ornamentation at a fine level of detail. In Eldonia and Stellostomites, the dorsal disc appears to bear radial internal structures, mimicking the radial sacs above the ventral disc. The dorsal disc has been interpreted as almost completely solid, with the radiating structures identified as very thin tubular canals. This is opposite to what is seen in the ventral disc, which has proportionally larger radiating cavities and slender solid septa.

Taxonomy 

 Eldonioidea (= Eldoniidae sensu lato)
 Eldoniidae sensu stricto
 Eldonia: middle Cambrian-Late Ordovician of Canada (British Columbia), USA (Utah), Russia, and Morocco
 Stellostomites (sometimes considered a species of Eldonia): early Cambrian of China (Yunnan)
 Rotadiscidae
 Pararotadiscus (previously considered a species of Rotadiscus): middle Cambrian of China (Guizhou)
 Rotadiscus: early to middle Cambrian of China (Yunnan) and Poland
 Seputus?: Ordovician of Ireland
 Vellumbrella?: early to middle Cambrian of Poland
 An unnamed Pararotadiscus-like taxon from the early Cambrian Emu Bay Shale of Australia
 "Paropsonemids"
 Discophyllum: Ordovician of USA (New York)
 Paropsonema: Silurian-Devonian of USA (New York) and Australia

References

Prehistoric deuterostomes
Burgess Shale fossils